The France women's national under-18 and under-19  is a national basketball team of France and is governed by the Fédération Française de Basket-Ball.
It represents France in international under-19 and under-18 (under age 19 and under age 18) women's basketball competitions.

FIBA Under-19 World Championship for women

See also
 France women's national basketball team
 France women's national under-17 basketball team
 France men's national under-19 basketball team

References

u
Women's national under-19 basketball teams